Jack Vale (born September 2, 1973) is an American YouTube personality, comedian, actor, and producer, who has a YouTube channel featuring hidden cameras and pranks. As of November 2019, his videos have over 475 million views and his channel has more than 1.5 million subscribers.

YouTube 
Many of Vale's pranks are what he calls "Pooter" pranks. These involve Vale walking around in public making flatulence sounds, using a handheld device and capturing the reactions of the people nearby on a hidden camcorder.  On one occasion this resulted in a physical altercation between Vale and an elderly man (whose wife Vale used the device on nearby). The subsequent police intervention led to the man being banned from that specific supermarket. Many of his pranks are completed in Huntington Beach, California, Nevada, and near his home in the Columbia, Tennessee area.

Other pranks include "Paranoid", sketches in which Vale, pretending to be talking on his mobile phone, walks past customers in a shop or on the street and describes them to his imaginary conversational partner (in order to see whether they will react with paranoia), and "Nonsense", in which Vale confuses members of the public by approaching them and speaking gibberish.

Jack Vale's most elaborate prank to date which by most, is considered to be more of an experiment, is called "The Social Media Experiment". Vale searched hashtags in his local area and located people nearby. He then learned all about these people and convinced them he was psychic. The video was picked up by several national publications and he made appearances on various talk shows explaining how he did the experiment.

Jack Vale Offline 
In 2015, Vale's reality TV show Jack Vale Offline premiered on January 13 on HLN. The show gave a behind-the-scenes look at his pranking videos, as well as a look at his family life. The show lasted for six episodes.

Television and film 
On September 18, 2014, Jack Vale appeared on Jimmy Kimmel Live  in a segment he shot with Guillermo and Jack's family using the Social Media Experiment.

Vale has appeared on Lopez Tonight, performing pranks on various celebrities at the 53rd Grammy Awards, and performing pranks at a reality television show convention.
Jack Vale also co-produced and starred in all 40 episodes of the first season of TV's Bloopers and Practical Jokes with Dick Clark Productions when the show revived in 2012. It was hosted by Dean Cain.

In July 2014, Vale was a special guest on The View where he talked about filming Social Media Experiments and his "Pooter". He has also appeared on Fox and Friends, CNBC, The Doctors and several other TV shows.

Vale starred as Director Bob in 2019 teen dance film, Next Level.

In 2012, Vale produced 40 episodes of Bloopers for Dick Clark Productions.

Personal life
Vale has been married to his wife Sherry, since October 18, 1997. Together they have five children; Madysyn, Jaxon, Chris, Jake and Jazmyn.

Filmography

Crew work

References

External links 
 Official "Pooter" website for his flatulence device

1973 births
Living people
Place of birth missing (living people)
People from Roseville, California
American YouTubers
Comedians from California
21st-century American comedians
American male comedians
Prank YouTubers